Powell is a feature on Earth's Moon, a crater in Taurus–Littrow valley.  Astronauts Eugene Cernan and Harrison Schmitt landed less than 1 km northeast of it in 1972, on the Apollo 17 mission, but they did not visit it.

To the north of Powell is Trident and the landing site.  To the northwest are Camelot and Horatio, and to the northeast is Sherlock.  Steno and Emory are to the southeast.

The crater was named by the astronauts after John Wesley Powell, geologist and explorer of the American West.

References

External links
43D1S2(25) Apollo 17 Traverses at Lunar and Planetary Institute
Geological Investigation of the Taurus–Littrow Valley: Apollo 17 Landing Site

Impact craters on the Moon
Apollo 17